Les Stocker  (31 January 1943 – 16 July 2016) was a British wildlife campaigner and expert who founded Tiggywinkles, the United Kingdom's first hospital for wild animals, in 1983. Stocker has been credited with revolutionizing the treatment of sick or injured wild animals in Britain through the practice of wildlife rehabilitation, which is now commonplace across the country. He received numerous honors for his work at Tiggywinkles, including the Rolex Awards for Enterprise in 1990, an appointment as a Member of the Most Excellent Order of the British Empire (MBE) for services to wildlife in 1991, and recognition as an honorary associate of the Royal College of Veterinary Surgeons in 2002.

Stocker was born on 31 January 1943 in Battersea to Rose (née Weaving) Stocker, a civil servant, and Rob Stocker, a site manager. He attended Emanuel School in Battersea and became an accountant, and also had a spell running a company specializing in electrical engineering. He married his wife, the former Sue Gee, in 1964 and moved to Buckinghamshire.

Les Stocker began his work in wildlife rehabilitation by rescuing and treating animals in the shed of his Buckinghamshire home. In 1983, he established the Wildlife Hospital Trust, the country's first wildlife hospital. A drought in 1984 brought a large number of distressed hedgehogs to the hospital as patients. In 1985, in response, Stocker set up a ward solely to treat the numerous hedgehogs. He named the ward St Tiggywinkles after the fictional hedgehog character created by Beatrix Potter. The entire Wildlife Hospital Trust hospital gradually came to be known simply as "Tiggywinkles". In 1991, Stocker moved Tiggywinkles to its present location in Haddenham, Buckinghamshire.

Under Stocker, Tiggywinkles pioneered new treatments for wild animals, ranging from birds of prey, like kestrels, to toads and badgers. Notably, it is estimated that 30% of the approximately 10,000 animals treated at Tiggywinkles each year are hedgehogs. Stocker and his staff developed new medical treatments specifically for hedgehogs, which are now utilized at rehabilitation centers throughout Britain. Les Stocker even established a museum devoted to hedgehogs, Hedgehog World, showcasing related artifacts from ancient Egypt to the present day, on the Tiggywinkles grounds.

He published a memoir, Something in a Cardboard Box (1989), in which he encouraged others to give back and make a difference.

Rolex honored Stocker with its Rolex Award for Enterprise in 1990 and he was appointed an MBE in 1991 for his service to wildlife. In 2002, the Royal College of Veterinary Surgeons recognized Stocker, who had no formal veterinary training, as an honorary associate.

Les Stocker died unexpectedly on 16 July 2016 at the age of 73. He was survived by his wife, Sue, whom he married in 1964, their son, Colin, who currently manages the Wildlife Hospital Trust, and his granddaughters, Amelia and Alexia.

References

1943 births
2016 deaths
British activists
Wildlife rehabilitation
British founders
British memoirists
Museum founders
Members of the Order of the British Empire
People from Battersea
People from Buckinghamshire
20th-century philanthropists